Qian Qianli (born 7 February 1965) is a Chinese-born table tennis player who represented Austria at the 1996 Summer Olympics.

References

External links
 

1965 births
Living people
People from Qidong, Jiangsu
Table tennis players from Jiangsu
Austrian male table tennis players
Chinese emigrants to Austria
Chinese male table tennis players
Table tennis players at the 1996 Summer Olympics
Olympic table tennis players of Austria
Naturalised table tennis players
Sportspeople from Nantong
Austrian sportspeople of Chinese descent